Association Sportive de Mandé is a Malian professional women's football club based in the capital city, Bamako. It currently plays in the Malian Women's Championship, the women's top tier of Malian football. The club is affiliated to AS Mandé, a men's team who previously played in the Malian Première Division.

The club has won the women's championship in 2021 season. Following that, they were selected as the representative for Mali at the WAFU A qualifiers which they won after beating Senegalese team AS Dakar Sacré-Cœur by 4–0 in the finals and qualified them to the inaugural 2021 CAF Women's Champions League.

Players

Current squad

Honours

Domestic 
League titles

 Malian Women's Championship

 Winners (2): 2017, 2021

 Malian Women's Cup

 Winners (4): 2012, 2014, 2015, 2016

 Bamako League

 Winners (7): 2004, 2007, 2009, 2010, 2011, 2013, 2014

Continental 

 WAFU A-CAF Women's Champions League Qualifiers

 Winners  (1): 2021

See also 

 Malian Women's Championship

References 

Football clubs in Mali
Women's football clubs in Mali